Capo Grecale Lighthouse is an active lighthouse located on the
northern eastern tip of the island on the edge of a cliff, in the municipality of Lampedusa, Sicily on the Strait of Sicily.

Description
The tower is unpainted concrete and the lantern is white; the lantern dome is grey metallic. The lighthouse is completely automated and managed by the Marina Militare with the identification code number 3038 E.F.

See also
 List of lighthouses in Italy

References

External links

 Servizio Fari Marina Militare

Lighthouses in Italy
Buildings and structures in Sicily